Marco Mazzi (born May 5, 1980) is an Italian multimedia artist, living and working in Tokyo, Florence, and Tirana. He worked as an editor in the publication of books of contemporary Japanese poetry, such as The Other Voice, the first Italian translation of Yoshimasu Gozo's poetry.

Biography
Mazzi studied Contemporary literature at the University of Florence and visited Tokyo, where he studied Japanese avant-garde art and visual poetry. He held exhibitions at the 798 Art District in Beijing (China), the Komaba Art Museum of Tokyo (Japan), the Torino “Artissima” Art Fair (Italy), the Centro per l'arte contemporanea Luigi Pecci (Prato, Italy) and the Yokohama Museum of Art (Japan). In January 2008 The Watari Museum of Contemporary Art of Tokyo held the first solo exhibition of the artist in Japan, screening his single channel video installation Voyager, a Journey through Time and Water (2005-2008). In October 2009 the Museo Laboratorio di Arte Contemporanea (MLAC, Rome) held Mazzi's exhibition "Seeing and Knowing, the Naturalization of Vision", curated by the Italian writer and art critic Lorenzo Carlucci. In March 2010 he took part in the exhibition "Il medium disperso" (MLAC, Rome) together with Keren Cytter and Clemens von Wedemeyer. In 2008 Mazzi founded the non-profit organization "Relational Cinema Association" within the University of Waseda in Tokyo. The project involves screening of films and videos by Francesca Banchelli, Eric Baudelaire, Johanna Billing, Josef Dabernig, Gianluca and Massimiliano De Serio, Harun Farocki, Marine Hugonnier, Mark Lewis, Amie Siegel, Apichatpong Weerasethakul. Mazzi was photographer in residence at The Department of Eagles (Tirana, Albania), together with Diego Cossentino, during the conference “Pedagogies of Disaster, a Continent Conference”. In 2013 Mazzi collaborated with Jonas Staal for the project "The Venice Biennale Ideological Guide". Moreover, Mazzi was stage and still photographer for the leading Albanian artist Armando Lulaj during the making of the film "Recapitulation" (2015). The film was part of Armando Lulaj's installation "Albanian Trilogy", commissioned by the 2015 Venice Biennale's Albanian Pavilion.

The Albanian  Survey
During the communist period, the Albanian regime erected a large number of so-called  in virtually every village, town, and city in Albania. These concrete monoliths on the one hand functioned as monuments commemorating a variety of “heroes of the nation” and “partizans” but on the other hand also monumentalized the presence of the communist party in every part of the country. Their function as markers of social progress as well as commemoration is clearly shown in the 1984 Kinostudio documentary “Lapidari.” The ubiquity of these monumental structures and their relative opacity in the current cityscape – neither being demolished nor maintained, but having largely fallen into disrepair – reflect the common attitude regarding undigested communist past of Albania. Vincent W. J. van Gerven Oei's 2014-2015 project "Albanian  Survey" involved archival research into the construction and topography of all  in Albania and their historical context. The project intended to overcome a mere esthetic appreciation of communist architecture but rather provide a thorough documentation of a unique mode of communist monumentality, making them accessible as possible for future research through an online database and open access publication. Mazzi was photographer in residence for the "Albanian  Survey" project and photographed over six hundred communist monuments and architectural sites all over Albania.

Filmmaking
In 2010 Mazzi shoot a documentary film Kiju Yoshida and a Vision of Fear, in collaboration with Kiju Yoshida, the acclaimed Japanese film director. Mazzi directed several experimental documentary features and single-channel video installations, such as "Records of Experience" (2011), "Tokyo Elegy" (2012), and "Hypothesis for an Ideological Journey" (2012-2020, featuring Harun Farocki). In 2018 the Luigi Pecci Center for Contemporary Art of Prato (Italy) screened the video by Marco Mazzi "Ricognizione (Aprile)]".

References

External links
 https://web.archive.org/web/20110722034703/http://www.arte.go.it/eventi/2008/e_0131.htm
 https://web.archive.org/web/20120207091101/http://www.teknemedia.net/archivi/2008/1/18/mostra/27742.html
 http://www.gliori.it/scheda_libro.php?id=337

1980 births
Italian contemporary artists
Photographers from Florence
University of Florence alumni
Living people